Amala ( – 21 September 1921) and Kamala (died 14 November 1929) were two "feral girls" from Bengal, India, who were alleged to have been raised by a wolf family.

Their story attracted substantial mainstream attention and debate. However, the account was reported and promoted by only one source, the clergyman who claimed to have discovered the girls. Because of this, there is some controversy as to the authenticity of the story. French surgeon Serge Aroles concluded in his book L'Enigme des enfants-loup (Enigma of the Wolf-Children, 2007) that the story was a hoax.

Appearance
In 1926, Joseph Amrito Lal Singh, the rector of the local orphanage, published an account in The Statesman published from Calcutta saying that the two girls were given to him by a man who lived in the jungle near the village of Godamuri, in the district of Midnapore, west of Calcutta, and that the girls, when he first saw them, lived in a sort of cage near the house. Later, he claimed that he himself rescued the girls from the wolves' den on 9 October 1920. He named the children and wrote his observations of them in a "diary" (consisting of loose sheets, some dated and some undated) for almost ten years – which, if accurate, would represent one of the best documented efforts to observe and rehabilitate feral children. The diary entry of 17 October 1920 states, "...the mother wolf, whose nature was so ferocious and affection so sublime. It struck me with wonder. I was simply amazed to think that an animal had such a noble feeling surpassing even that of mankind ... to bestow all the love and affection of a fond and ideal mother on these peculiar beings." Kamala was at the time about eight years old, Amala about 18 months.

Behaviour and treatment
Singh claims in his diary that, at the orphanage, the two girls showed wolf-like behaviour typical for feral children. They would not allow themselves to be dressed, scratched and bit people who tried to feed them, rejected cooked food and walked on all fours. Both girls had developed thick calluses on their palms and knees from having walked on all fours. The girls were mostly nocturnal, had an aversion to sunshine, and could see very well in the dark. They also exhibited an acute sense of smell and an enhanced ability to hear.

The girls enjoyed the taste of raw meat and would eat out of a bowl on the ground. They seemed to be insensitive to cold and heat and appeared to show no human emotions of any kind, apart from fear. At night they would howl like wolves, calling out to their "family". They did not speak.

Unity author Imelda Octavia Shanklin referred to their case in her 1929 book, What Are You?: "I once heard a missionary tell of seeing two girls who had been rescued from a den of wolves in Asia. As babies they had been abandoned, and, in a measure duplicating the young lives of Romulus and Remus, had been mothered by a female wolf. The children ran fleetly on all fours; they snarled and bit at their captors. The forehead retreated, the lower face protruded in unmistakable likeness to the foster-parent beast that had shown them more of mother love than their human mothers had shown."

Singh claims that he took on the difficult task of trying to teach them ordinary human behaviour. Amala died in 1921 of a kidney infection. She was buried in the graveyard of St. John's Church, Midnapore. Kamala showed signs of mourning at her death. After this, Kamala became more approachable. She was eventually partially house-trained and became used to the company of other human beings. After years of hard work, she was able to walk upright a little, although never proficiently and would often revert to all fours when she needed to go somewhere quickly, and learned to speak a few words. She died in 1929 of tuberculosis.

Controversy
Because of the many different versions, none of them substantiated by any witnesses other than Mr Singh himself, there persists considerable controversy as to the veracity of the account.  The "myth" of having been raised by wolves is an ancient Indo-European conception (see: feral child) to explain the animal-like behaviour of abandoned children with congenital defects.

Recent study
According to the French surgeon Serge Aroles, the case of Amala and Kamala is the most scandalous swindle concerning feral children. In his book L'Enigme des enfants-loup (Enigma of the Wolf-Children, 2007), Aroles describes his research of the case. He scrutinised archives and formerly unknown sources and concludes:
The original diary which Singh claimed to have written "day after day during the life of the two wolf-girls" is false. It was written in India after 1935, six years after Kamala's death. (The original manuscript is kept in the manuscripts division of the US Library of Congress in Washington, D.C.).
The pictures showing the two wolf-girls walking on all fours, eating raw meat, and others, were taken in 1937, after the deaths of both of them. The pictures actually show two girls from Midnapore posing at Singh's request.
According to the medical doctor in charge of the orphanage, Kamala had none of the anomalies invented by Singh, such as very sharp and long teeth, all-four locomotion with fixed joints, nocturnal vision with emission of an intense blue glare by her eyes during the night, etc.
According to several reliable testimonies collected in 1951–1952, Singh used to beat Kamala in order to make her act as he had described in front of visitors.
Aroles is reported to have letters between Singh and Professor Robert M. Zingg, in which Zingg expresses his belief in the financial value of the story and requesting to collaborate on its publication. After his publication of Singh's diary, Zingg sent a royalty payment of US$500 to Singh, who was desperately in need of money to maintain the orphanage. 
Zingg took Singh at his word as to the authenticity of his accounting of the girls. The book he co-authored with Singh, Wolf-Children and Feral Man, drew extensive criticism from anthropologists, the most outspoken of whom being Ashley Montagu. Zingg paid dearly for his failure to independently verify the authenticity of Singh's account and the fallout of this controversy resulted in Dr Zingg's dismissal from his academic post at the University of Denver in 1942. He never taught again after the scandal.
Kamala was afflicted with a neurodevelopmental disorder, Rett syndrome.

Scholars from Japan and France later supported Aroles' conclusions.

References in culture
Bhanu Kapil's book "Humanimal, A Project for Future Children" focuses heavily on Amala and Kamala and reclaiming their story from the mediation of Reverend Mr Singh.
Jane Yolen's book, Children of the Wolf, is a fictionalized account of the story for young adult readers.
Jane Yolen and Heidi E.Y. Stemple's book, History Mystery: The Wolf Girls, is a children's non-fiction book about the account.
Lord Robert Baden-Powell gives a short account of the story in Chapter 6 of his 1940 book, More Sketches of Kenya
Arnold Gesell's book Wolf Child and Human Child is also heavily based on Singh's account which it presents uncritically.
The Jungle Book

References

Sources

 P. J. Blumenthal: Kaspar Hausers Geschwister – Auf der Suche nach dem wilden Menschen (Deuticke, Vienna/Frankfurt, 2003)

External links
J.A.L. Singh: Diary of the Wolf-Children of Midnapore (India)
: J.A.L. Singh and Robert M. Zingg Wolf-Children and Feral Man   Harper and Brothers Publishers, New York and London, 1942
Wolf-Children and Feral Man by J.A.L. Singh and Robert M. Zingg, Ashley Montagu, book review in American Anthropologist Volume 45, Issue 3, July–September 1943, Pages 468–472; First published: 9 July 1943 (PDF)

Duos
Feral children
Hoaxes in India
Indian children
People from West Bengal
1920s hoaxes
Child deaths